Curvus khuludi is an extinct species of fly from the Lower Cretaceous of Jordan, belonging to the family Dolichopodidae. It is the only member of the genus Curvus.

References

†
Early Cretaceous insects
Insects described in 2005
Fossil taxa described in 2005